Marion Elizabeth Stark (23 Aug 1894 – 15 April 1982) was an American mathematician. She was one of the first women to receive a Ph.D. in mathematics.

Education and career
She got her A.B. in 1916, and her A.M. in 1917, both from Brown University. In 1917, she became the professor of mathematics Meredith College in Raleigh, North Carolina. In autumn 1919, she started teaching in Wellesley College as a part-time instructor, while attending courses of Helen Abbot Merrill and Mabel M. Young. In the 1923 summer quarter, and, supported by a fellowship, in autumn 1924 through summer 1925, she studied at the University of Chicago where she received her Ph.D. in 1926.

In 1927, she was appointed assistant professor of mathematics at Wellesley, in 1936, she was promoted to an associate professor there. In 1945, she was promoted to a professorship; in 1946, she became Chairman of the Department. In 1960, she retired from Wellesley after 40 years, her last rank being a Lewis Atterbury Stimson Professor of Mathematics.

Recognition
Stark was named a Fellow of the American Association for the Advancement of Science in 1938.

References

1894 births
1982 deaths
20th-century American mathematicians
American women mathematicians
Brown University alumni
Meredith College faculty
Wellesley College faculty
20th-century women mathematicians
20th-century American women
Fellows of the American Association for the Advancement of Science